The 1898 St. Louis Browns season was the team's 17th season in St. Louis, Missouri and the 7th season in the National League. The Browns went 39–111 during the season and finished 12th in the National League.

Chris von der Ahe, who had owned the team since its inception in 1882, was forced into court due to his mounting debts related to owning the Browns.  Von der Ahe lost the team in the trial and it was bought by brothers Stanley and Frank Robison after the 1898 season. The Robisons, who were also owners of the Cleveland Spiders, first renamed the team the "Perfectos" in 1899, and transferred all of the Spiders' best players to the team. Eventually, the team's colors were changed to red, and nickname to the Cardinals.

Regular season

Season standings

Record vs. opponents

Roster

Player stats

Batting

Starters by position 
Note: Pos = Position; G = Games played; AB = At bats; H = Hits; Avg. = Batting average; HR = Home runs; RBI = Runs batted in

Other batters 
Note: G = Games played; AB = At bats; H = Hits; Avg. = Batting average; HR = Home runs; RBI = Runs batted in

Pitching

Starting pitchers 
Note: G = Games pitched; IP = Innings pitched; W = Wins; L = Losses; ERA = Earned run average; SO = Strikeouts

Other pitchers 
Note: G = Games pitched; IP = Innings pitched; W = Wins; L = Losses; ERA = Earned run average; SO = Strikeouts

Relief pitchers 
Note: G = Games pitched; W = Wins; L = Losses; SV = Saves; ERA = Earned run average; SO = Strikeouts

See also
List of worst Major League Baseball season records

External links 
1898 St. Louis Browns at Baseball Reference
1898 St. Louis Browns team page at www.baseball-almanac.com

St. Louis Cardinals seasons
Saint Louis Browns season
St Louis